These are the results for the 2005 edition of the Vuelta a España cycling race. Roberto Heras was the original champion but the win was awarded to Russian Denis Menchov after Heras tested positive in a doping test.  Heras made an appeal through the Spanish courts, which ruled in his favour in June 2011 and this decision was upheld in the Spanish supreme court in December 2012; the Spanish cycling federation was not yet sure how to act, but said that the most likely result is that Heras will be reinstated.

The points classification was won by Alessandro Petacchi from Italy, the mountains classification was won by Joaquim Rodríguez from Spain and the combination classification was won by Denis Menchov.  was the winner of the team ranking.

Teams and riders

In addition to the 20 ProTour teams,  and Relax Fuenlabrada were given wildcard entries.

Route

Race overview

Jersey Progress

General Standings

KOM Classification

Points Classification

Best Team

References

External links
Race website

 
2005
 
2005 UCI ProTour